Orania simonetae is a species of sea snail, a marine gastropod mollusk in the family Muricidae, the murex snails or rock snails.

Description

Distribution
This marine species occurs off the Marquesas Islands, French Polynesia.

References

External links
 MNHN, Paris: holotype
 Houart, R. (1995). The Ergalataxinae (Gastropoda, Muricidae) from the New Caledonia region with some comments on the subfamily and the description of thirteen new species from the Indo-West Pacific. Bulletin du Muséum National d'Histoire Naturelle, Paris. ser. 4, 16 (A, 2-4): 245-297

Gastropods described in 1995
Orania (gastropod)